Lalitpur Assembly constituency is one of the 403 assembly constituencies of Uttar Pradesh. It is a part of Jhansi parliamentary constituency and comes under Lalitpur district of Uttar Pradesh.

Members of Legislative Assembly
2012: Ramesh Prasad Kushwaha, Bahujan Samaj Party

Election results

2017

2012

References

http://www.elections.in/uttar-pradesh/assembly-constituencies/lalitpur.html

External links
 

Assembly constituencies of Uttar Pradesh
Lalitpur, India